Yaksha is a name of several nature-spirits in Hindu and Buddhist mythology.

Yaksha may also refer to:
Yaksha Kingdom, territory of a mythical tribe in ancient India and ancient Sri Lanka
Yaksha (rural locality), several rural localities in Russia
Yaksha: Ruthless Operations, a 2022 South Korean film
Yaksha, a genus with one species, Yaksha perettii, an extinct amphibian

See also
Jakh Botera or Bohter Yaksha, a group of folk deities worshiped in Kutch district of Gujarat, India
Yaksha Prashna, a story from the Mahabharata
Yakshagana, a traditional theatre form
Yaksa (band), a Chinese metalcore band
Yasha (disambiguation)